Lebedinka is a rural locality (a selo) and the administrative center of Pervomayskoye Rural Settlement, Bogucharsky District, Voronezh Oblast, Russia. The population was 760 as of 2010. There are 8 streets.

Geography 
Lebedinka is located on the right bank of the Levaya Bogucharka River, 44 km south of Boguchar (the district's administrative centre) by road. Novonikolsk is the nearest rural locality.

References 

Rural localities in Bogucharsky District